Leonardo Wilson de Medeiros (born 20 November 1964) is a Brazilian actor.

Before Os Maias, he had worked together with Luiz Fernando Carvalho in To the Left of the Father (2001), a film based on a novel by Raduan Nassar.

His most recent movies include O Veneno da Madrugada, Cabra Cega, Corpo, Não Por Acaso, Getúlio, A menina que matou os pais and O menino que matou meus pais.

References

External links
 

Living people
1964 births
Brazilian male film actors
Brazilian male telenovela actors
Male actors from Rio de Janeiro (city)